"You Are the Song (Inside of Me)" is a single by American country music artist Freddie Hart. Released in January 1976, it was the third single from his album The First Time. The song peaked at number 11 on the Billboard Hot Country Singles chart. It also reached number 1 on the RPM Country Tracks chart in Canada.

Chart performance

References 

1976 singles
Freddie Hart songs
Capitol Records singles
1976 songs